was a town located in Yuri District, Akita Prefecture, Japan.

In 2003, the town had an estimated population of 4,536 and a density of 30.21 persons per km². The total area was 150.17 km².

On March 22, 2005, Higashiyuri, along with the city of Honjō; and the towns of Chōkai, Iwaki, Nishime, Ōuchi, Yashima and Yuri (all from Yuri District), merged to create the city of Yurihonjō.

External links
 Yurihonjō official website 

Dissolved municipalities of Akita Prefecture
Yurihonjō